Frullania is the only genus of liverworts in family Frullaniaceae. It contains the following species:

A
Frullania aculeata Taylor, 1846
Frullania acutata Caspary, 1887
Frullania acutiloba Gerola, 1947
Frullania akiyamae Hattori, 1986
Frullania albertii Stephani, 1916
Frullania allanii Hodgson, 1949
Frullania allionii Stephani, 1910
Frullania alpina Stephani, 1911
Frullania alstonii Verdoorn, 1930
Frullania alstonii var. pfleidereri Hattori, 1972
Frullania alternans Nees In G., L. & N., 1845
Frullania amamiensis Kamimura, 1968
Frullania ambronnii Stephani, 1916
Frullania amplicrania Stephani, 1910
Frullania ampullifera Jack & Stephani In Stephani, 1894
Frullania anderssonii Ångström, 1873
Frullania angulata Mitten, 1863
Frullania angulata F. Serratoides Vanden Berghen, 1983
Frullania angulata var. laciniata Demaret & Vanden Berghen, 1950
Frullania angustistipa Stephani, 1908
Frullania anomala Hodgson, 1949
Frullania antaresensis Hattori, 1980
Frullania aoshimensis Horikawa, 1929
Frullania apertilobula Gerola, 1947
Frullania apicalis Mitten, 1879
Frullania apicalis var. camerunensis Vanden Berghen, 1976
Frullania apiculata (R., B. & N.) Nees In G., L. & N., 1845
Frullania apiculata var. goebelii Schiffner, 1893
Frullania apiculata var. guianensis Lindenberg & Gottsche, 1851
Frullania apiculata var. laxa Nees In G., L. & N., 1845
Frullania apollinarii Stephani, 1911
Frullania aposinensis Hattori & Lin, 1985
Frullania appalachiana Schuster, 1983
Frullania appendistipula Hattori, 1972
Frullania appendistipula var. spinifera Hattori, 1974
Frullania arecae (Sprengel) Gottsche, 1863
Frullania arecae var. spiniloba (Stephani) Yuzawa, 1991
Frullania armata Herzog & Clark In Clark, 1954
Frullania armatifolia Verdoorn, 1932
Frullania armitiana Stephani, 1911
Frullania armitiana var. inflexula Hattori, 1988
Frullania armitiana var. longe-Attenuata (Hattori) Hattori, 1980
Frullania arsenii Stephani, 1924
Frullania asagrayana Montagne, 1842
Frullania astrolabea Stephani, 1910
Frullania aterrima (Hooker & Taylor) Hooker & Taylor In G., L. & N., 1845
Frullania aterrima var. lepida Hodgson, 1949
Frullania atrata (Swartz) Montagne, 1839
Frullania atrata var. flaccida (Weber) Nees In G., L. & N., 1845
Frullania atrata var. mexicana Nees In G., L. & N., 1845
Frullania atrosanguinea Taylor Ex Spruce, 1884
Frullania attenuata Stephani, 1911
Frullania auriculata Hattori, 1985
Frullania azorica Sim-Sim, Sergio, Mues & Kraut, 1995

B
Frullania baileyana Stephani, 1910
Frullania bakeri Stephani, 1916
Frullania baladina Gottsche Ex Stephani, 1894
Frullania baladina var. edentata Hattori, 1984
Frullania baltica Grolle, 1985
Frullania baumannii Hattori, 1977
Frullania beauverdii Stephani, 1916
Frullania bella Stephani, 1911
Frullania belmorensis Stephani In Stephani & Watts, 1914
Frullania benjaminiana Inoue In Hattori, 1975
Frullania bergmanii Hattori, 1974
Frullania berthoumieui Stephani, 1894
Frullania beyrichiana (Lehmann & Lindenberg In Lehmann) Lehmann & Lindenberg In G., L. & N., 1845
Frullania bhutanensis Hattori, 1971
Frullania bicornistipula Spruce, 1884
Frullania blastopetala Hattori, 1984
Frullania blepharozia Spruce, 1884
Frullania bogotensis Stephani, 1910
Frullania bolanderi Austin, 1869
Frullania bonariensis Reiner, 1988
Frullania bonincola Hattori, 1978
Frullania borbonica Lindenberg In G., L. & N., 1845
Frullania boveana Massalongo, 1885
Frullania brachycarpa Spruce, 1889
Frullania brasiliensis Raddi, 1822
Frullania brasiliensis var. cylindrica (Gottsche In Lehmann) Spruce, 1884
Frullania brasiliensis var. cylindrica F. Lindigii (Gottsche) Spruce, 1884
Frullania breuteliana Gottsche In G., L. & N., 1845
Frullania brevicalycina Stephani, 1894
Frullania brittoniae Evans, 1897
Frullania brotheri Stephani, 1894
Frullania brunnea (Sprengel) Drège, 1843
Frullania buchtienii Herzog, 1942
Frullania bullata Stephani, 1910

C
Frullania caduca Hattori, 1980
Frullania caespitans Beauverd In Stephani, 1924
Frullania caffraria Stephani, 1894
Frullania caffraria F. Anomala Vanden Berghen, 1976
Frullania calcarata Ångström, 1873
Frullania caldensis Ångström, 1876
Frullania caledonica Gottsche Ex Stephani, 1894
Frullania californica (Austin Ex Underwood) Evans, 1897
Frullania campanulata Sande Lacoste, 1853
Frullania campanulata var. caduca Verdoorn, 1930
Frullania campanulata var. malesiaca (Verdoorn) Hattori, 1975
Frullania canaliculata Gottsche Ex Stephani, 1910
Frullania capensis Gottsche In G., L. & N., 1845
Frullania capillaris Stephani, 1911
Frullania carrii Kamimura & Hattori In Hattori & Kamimura, 1973
Frullania casparyi Grolle, 1985
Frullania cataractarum Stephani, 1911
Frullania caulisequa (Nees In Martius) Montagne, 1839
Frullania cavallii Gola, 1907
Frullania cesatiana De Notaris, 1865
Frullania changii Hattori & Gao, 1985
Frullania chenii Hattori & Lin, 1985
Frullania chevalieri (Schuster) Schuster, 1992
Frullania chiapasana Stephani, 1910
Frullania chilcootiensis Stephani, 1887
Frullania chilensis Stephani, 1894
Frullania chiovendae Gola, 1914
Frullania chodatii Beauverd In Stephani, 1924
Frullania ciliata Lindenberg & Gottsche In G., L. & N., 1847
Frullania cinchonae Gottsche In G., L. & N., 1845
Frullania clandestina (Nees & Montagne) Nees In G., L. & N., 1845
Frullania clavata (Hooker & Taylor) Taylor In G., L. & N., 1845
Frullania claviloba Stephani, 1911
Frullania clemensiana Verdoorn, 1932
Frullania cobrensis Gottsche Ex Stephani, 1894
Frullania compacta Gottsche Ex Stephani, 1911
Frullania complicata Stephani, 1911
Frullania confertiloba Stephani, 1910
Frullania consociata Stephani, 1910
Frullania contracta Stephani, 1911
Frullania controversa Beauverd In Stephani, 1924
Frullania convoluta Lindenberg & Hampe In Hampe, 1851
Frullania convoluta var. ampliata Herzog, 1953
Frullania cordaeana Lindenberg In G., L. & N., 1845
Frullania cordistipula (Reinwardt, Blume & Nees) Nees In G., L. & N., 1845
Frullania cordistipula var. (Beta) mutica Nees In G., L. & N., 1845
Frullania cordistipula var. (Gamma) regularis Nees In G., L. & N., 1845
Frullania cordistipula var. dentistipula Hattori, 1986
Frullania cornuta Stephani, 1911
Frullania crassitexta Stephani, 1910
Frullania crawfordii Stephani, 1894
Frullania crenulifolia Jack & Stephani, 1892
Frullania crinoidea Spruce Ex Stephani In Stephani, 1911
Frullania crispiloba Stephani, 1894
Frullania crispiplicata Yuzawa & Hattori Ex Konstantinova, Potemkin & Schijakov, 1992
Frullania cristata Hattori, 1981
Frullania cuencensis Taylor, 1846
Frullania cuneatistipula Stephani, 1924
Frullania cuneiloba Nees In G., L. & N., 1845
Frullania curviramea Stephani, 1911
Frullania curvirostris Colenso, 1889
Frullania curvistipula Stephani, 1911
Frullania curvistipula var. falcatidenta Hattori, 1982
Frullania curvistipula var. lamii Verdoorn, 1930
Frullania curvistipula var. latistipula Hattori, 1978
Frullania cuspidifolia Stephani, 1911
Frullania cuspiloba Stephani, 1910
Frullania cyparioides (Schwägrichen) Schwaegrichen In G., L. & N., 1845

D
Frullania darwinii Gradstein & Uribe In Uribe, 2004
Frullania davurica Hampe In G., L. & N., 1845
Frullania davurica F. Dorsoblastos (Hattori) Hattori & Lin, 1985
Frullania davurica F. Microphylla (Massalongo) Hattori & Lin, 1985
Frullania davurica var. chichibuensis (Kamimura) Hattori, 1976
Frullania davurica var. concava Chang In Gao & Chang, 1981
Frullania debilis Stephani Ex Hattori, 1974
Frullania decidua Spruce, 1884
Frullania deflexa Mitten, 1862
Frullania degelii Arnell, 1959
Frullania densifolia Subsp. Andamana Hattori Ex Singh In Nath & Asthana, 2001
Frullania densiloba Stephani Ex Evans, 1906
Frullania dentata Hattori, 1974
Frullania dentata var. secernens Hattori, 1988
Frullania dentifera Hattori & Streimann, 1985
Frullania dentiloba Hattori, 1975
Frullania deplanata Mitten In Hooker, 1855
Frullania deppii Gottsche Ex Lehmann, 1844
Frullania depressa Mitten, 1863
Frullania dilatata Subsp. (Dilatata 1982) (L.) Dumortier, 1835
Frullania dilatata Subsp. (Dilatata 1982) F. Fuscovirens Jorgensen, 1934
Frullania dilatata Subsp. (Dilatata 1982) var. anomala Corbiere, 1889
Frullania dilatata Subsp. (Dilatata 1982) var. macrotus Nees, 1838
Frullania dilatata Subsp. (Dilatata 1982) var. subtilissima Nees, 1838
Frullania dilatata Subsp. Asiatica Hattori, 1982
Frullania diptera (Lehmann & Lindenberg) Drège, 1843
Frullania dispar Nees In G., L. & N., 1845
Frullania diversitexta Stephani, 1897
Frullania donnellii Austin, 1879
Frullania dulimensis Uribe, 2006
Frullania durifolia Stephani, 1894
Frullania dusenii Stephani In Dusen, 1905
Frullania duthiana Stephani, 1910
Frullania duthiana var. laevis Hattori In Ohashi, 1975
Frullania duthiana var. szechuanensis Hattori & Gao, 1985

E
Frullania eboracensis (Subsp. Eboracensis 1992) Gottsche Ex Lehmann, 1844
Frullania eboracensis Subsp. Virginica (Gottsche In Lehmann) Schuster, 1992
Frullania echinantha Hattori, 1974
Frullania echinatella Hattori, 1988
Frullania ecklonii (Sprengel) Sprengel In G., L. & N., 1845
Frullania ecklonii F. Robustior Gottsche, 1863
Frullania ecklonii F. Tenerior Sprengel, 1847
Frullania ecklonii var. huitamalcensis Gottsche, 1863
Frullania ecklonii var. rufescens Sprengel, 1847
Frullania ecuadoriensis Stephani, 1911
Frullania elegans Lehmann, 1857
Frullania elephantum Hattori, 1977
Frullania engelii Hattori, 1983
Frullania epiphylla Subsp. Fijiensis Hattori, 1985
Frullania eplicata Stephani, 1911
Frullania ericoides (Nees In Martius) Montagne, 1839
Frullania ericoides F. Ericoides (Nees) Verdoorn Ex Piippo, 1990
Frullania ericoides var. planescens (Verdoorn) Hattori, 1984
Frullania erostrata Hattori, 1974
Frullania errans Verdoorn, 1930
Frullania errans var. angulistipula Hattori, 1972
Frullania esenbeckiana Beauverd Ex Stephani, 1924
Frullania evelynae Hattori & Thaithong, 1978
Frullania evoluta Mitten, 1861
Frullania expansa Stephani, 1897
Frullania eymae Hattori, 1975
Frullania eymae var. crispidentata Hattori & Streimann, 1985

F
Frullania falciloba Taylor Ex Lehmann, 1844
Frullania fallax Gottsche In G., L. & N., 1845
Frullania falsicornuta Hattori, 1986
Frullania falsisinuata Hattori & Piippo, 1986
Frullania falsisinuata F. Parvistylata (Hattori) Hattori & Piippo, 1986
Frullania falsisinuata var. crispidentata Hattori & Piippo, 1986
Frullania fauriana Stephani, 1894
Frullania fauriana F. Emarginata Kamimura, 1952
Frullania fengyangshanensis Zhu & So, 1997
Frullania ferdinandi-Muelleri Stephani, 1910
Frullania fertilis var. major Massalongo, 1885
Frullania flammea Taylor Ex Spruce, 1884
Frullania flexicaulis Spruce, 1884
Frullania flexuosa Hattori, 1983
Frullania fragilifolia (Taylor) Taylor In G., L. & N., 1845
Frullania franciscana Howe, 1894
Frullania fuegiana Stephani, 1910
Frullania fugax (Hooker & Taylor) Taylor In G., L. & N., 1845
Frullania fulfordiae Hattori, 1987
Frullania fusco-Virens Stephani, 1910
Frullania fusco-Virens var. gemmipara (Schuster & Hattori In Hattori) Hattori & Lin, 1985

G
Frullania gabonensis Vanden Berghen, 1976
Frullania gaoligongensis Bai & Gao, 1999
Frullania gaudichaudii (Nees & Montagne) Nees & Montagne In G., L. & N., 1845
Frullania gaudichaudii F. Hasseltii (Sande Lacoste) Verdoorn, 1930
Frullania gemmulosa Hattori & Thaithong In Hattori, Thaithong & Kitagawa, 1977
Frullania gibbosa (Nees) Nees In Montagne, 1840
Frullania gibbosa var. major Gottsche, 1863
Frullania gigantea Stephani, 1911
Frullania giraldiana Massalongo, 1897
Frullania giraldiana var. handelii (Verdoorn) Hattori, 1972
Frullania globosa Hattori & Streimann, 1985
Frullania glomerata (Lehmann & Lindenberg In Lehmann) Lehmann & Lindenberg Ex Montagne, 1838
Frullania gracilicaulis Hattori, 1977
Frullania gracilis Subsp. (Gracilis 1978) (Reinwardt, Blume & Nees) Gottsche In G., L. & N., 1845
Frullania gracilis Subsp. (Gracilis 1978) var. brevior Nees In G., L. & N., 1845
Frullania gracilis Subsp. (Gracilis 1978) var. vittata Hattori, 1986
Frullania gracilis Subsp. Zennoskei Hattori & Thaithong, 1978
Frullania gradsteinii Yuzawa, Mues & Hattori, 1987
Frullania granatensis Gottsche, 1864
Frullania grandifolia Stephani, 1911
Frullania grandilobula Hattori & Piippo, 1986
Frullania grandistipula Lindenberg In G., L. & N., 1845
Frullania griffithsiana Gottsche In G., L. & N., 1846
Frullania grolleana Hattori, 1972
Frullania grossiclava Stephani, 1910
Frullania grossifolia Stephani, 1911
Frullania guadalupensis Gottsche Ex Stephani, 1911
Frullania gualaquizana Stephani, 1911
Frullania guatemalensis Stephani, 1911

H
Frullania haeckeriana Lindenberg In G., L. & N., 1846
Frullania haematocysta Spruce, 1884
Frullania hainanensis Hattori & Lin, 1986
Frullania hamata Stephani, 1911
Frullania hamaticoma Stephani, 1889
Frullania hamatiloba Stephani, 1910
Frullania hamatiloba F. Grosse-Appendiculata Hattori, 1944
Frullania hamatiloba var. latistipula Hattori, 1975
Frullania hamatosetacea Grolle In Grolle & Meister, 2004
Frullania hamiflora Herzog & Clark In Clark & Schultz, 1953
Frullania handelii Verdoorn In Handel-Mazzetti, 1930
Frullania handel-Mazzettii Hattori, 1981
Frullania hariotana Stephani, 1911
Frullania harpantha Herzog, 1942
Frullania hasskarliana Lindenberg In G., L. & N., 1845
Frullania hasskarliana var. gracilis Hattori, 1986
Frullania hasskarliana var. integribractea (Verdoorn) Hattori, 1975
Frullania hasskarliana var. parvidentata Hattori, 1986
Frullania hattoriana Godfrey & Godfrey, 1980
Frullania hattoriantha Udar & Nath, 1981
Frullania hattorii Konrat & Braggins, 2003
Frullania hawaiiensis Miller, 1953
Frullania hebridensis Stephani, 1911
Frullania hedrantha Hattori & Kamimura, 1973
Frullania helleri Stephani, 1910
Frullania herzogiana Stephani, 1911
Frullania herzogii Hattori, 1955
Frullania heteromorpha Schiffner, 1889
Frullania hicksiae Hattori, 1984
Frullania hicksiae F. Litoralis Hattori, 1988
Frullania higuchii Yuzawa & Hattori In Yuzawa & Koike, 1994
Frullania himalayensis Stephani, 1910
Frullania hinoi Kamimura, 1982
Frullania hiroshii Hattori, 1980
Frullania hirtiflora Spruce, 1884
Frullania holostipula Hattori & Griffin Iii, 1978
Frullania hottana Hattori, 1976
Frullania howeana Stephani In Stephani & Watts, 1914
Frullania huerlimannii Hattori, 1976
Frullania huerlimannii var. dioica Hattori, 1984
Frullania humbertii Vanden Berghen, 1976
Frullania humilis Spruce, 1890
Frullania hypoleuca Nees In G., L. & N., 1843
Frullania hypoleucula Hattori, 1984

I
Frullania imerinensis Stephani, 1911
Frullania immersa Stephani, 1896
Frullania incisoduthiana Hattori In Mizutani, 1979
Frullania incisoduthiana var. parva Hattori In Mizutani, 1979
Frullania incisostipula Stephani, 1924
Frullania inconstans Verdoorn, 1930
Frullania inconstans F. Integrior Verdoorn, 1930
Frullania inconstans var. grossedentata Kamimura & Hattori, 1973
Frullania incumbens Mitten In Hooker, 1855
Frullania incurva Hattori, 1988
Frullania inflata Gottsche In G., L. & N., 1845
Frullania inflata var. communis Schuster, 1985
Frullania inflata var. dioica Hattori & Thaithong, 1978
Frullania inflexa Mitten, 1861
Frullania inflexiloba Hattori, 1984
Frullania inouei Hattori, 1980
Frullania integristipula (Nees) Nees In G., L. & N., 1845
Frullania integristipula var. emarginata Verdoorn, 1929
Frullania intermedia Subsp. (Intermedia 1980) F. Billardieriana (Nees & Montagne In Montagne) Verdoorn, 1930
Frullania intermedia Subsp. (Intermedia 1980) var. non-Apiculata Hattori, 1975
Frullania intermedia Subsp. (Intermedia) (Reinwardt, Blume & Nees) Nees In G., L. & N., 1845
Frullania intermedia Subsp. Morokensis (Stephani) Hattori, 1980
Frullania intermixta Colenso, 1889
Frullania intumescens (Lehmann & Lindenberg In Lehmann) Lehmann & Lindenberg In G., L. & N., 1845
Frullania involuta Hampe Ex Stephani, 1911
Frullania involvens Hattori & Kamimura, 1973
Frullania iriomotensis Hattori, 1980
Frullania irregularis Hattori & Piippo, 1986
Frullania iwatsukii Hattori, 1972

J
Frullania jackii Subsp. (Jackii 1959) Gottsche In Gottsche & Rabenhorst, 1863
Frullania jackii Subsp. (Jackii 1959) F. Depauperata Grolle, 1970
Frullania jacobsii Hattori, 1986
Frullania jacquinotii Gottsche Ex Stephani, 1910
Frullania jelskii Loitlesberger, 1894
Frullania johnsonii Stephani, 1894
Frullania junghuhniana Gottsche In G., L. & N., 1845
Frullania junghuhniana var. bisexualis Hattori, 1976
Frullania junghuhniana var. tenella (Sande Lacoste) Grolle & Hattori In Hattori, 1982
Frullania junghuhniana var. tenella F. Monoica (Hattori) Hattori, 1986

K
Frullania kagoshimensis Subsp. (Kagoshimensis 1985) Stephani, 1910
Frullania kagoshimensis Subsp. (Kagoshimensis 1985) var. minor Kamimura, 1961
Frullania kagoshimensis Subsp. Hunanensis (Hattori) Hattori, 1985
Frullania kalimantanensis Hattori, 1986
Frullania kalimantanensis Piippo & Hattori In Piippo & Tan, 1992
Frullania kashyapii Verdoorn, 1932
Frullania kitagawana Hattori, 1984
Frullania klotzschii Nees Ex Stephani, 1911
Frullania koponenii Hattori, 1978
Frullania kunzei (Lehmann & Lindenberg In Lehmann) Lehmann & Lindenberg In G., L. & N., 1845
Frullania kunzei var. maritima Schuster, 1991

L
Frullania laetevirens Hampe In G., L. & N., 1845
Frullania laevi-Periantha Bai & Gao, 2000
Frullania lancistyla Stephani, 1910
Frullania larjiana Singh & Singh, 2005
Frullania laticaulis Spruce, 1890
Frullania latiflora Spruce, 1884
Frullania latogaleata Herzog, 1948
Frullania laxiflora Spruce, 1884
Frullania laxiflora var. crossii Spruce, 1884
Frullania leana Austin, 1869
Frullania leeuwenii Verdoorn, 1930
Frullania lepida Hattori & Piippo, 1986
Frullania letestui Vanden Berghen, 1976
Frullania levieri Stephani, 1910
Frullania libera Nees In G., L. & N., 1845
Frullania lindbergiana Gottsche, 1863
Frullania lindenbergii Gottsche Ex Lehmann, 1844
Frullania lindenbergii var. (Beta ?) Fusca Gottsche In G., L. & N., 1847
Frullania lindeniana Stephani, 1911
Frullania lindmanii Stephani, 1897
Frullania linii Hattori, 1981
Frullania lobato-Hastata Stephani, 1911
Frullania lobulata (Hooker) Hooker & Nees In G., L. & N., 1845
Frullania longipinna Stephani, 1910
Frullania longistipula Stephani In Renauld & Cardot, 1891
Frullania longistipula var. apiculata Demaret & Vanden Berghen, 1950
Frullania longistyla Yuzawa & Hattori, 1988
Frullania loricata Pearson, 1891
Frullania loricata var. laxa Pearson, 1891
Frullania ludoviciae Stephani, 1908
Frullania lushanensis Hattori & Lin, 1985

M
Frullania macgregorii Stephani, 1894
Frullania macgregorii var. rostellula (Hattori) Hattori, 1982
Frullania macrocephala (Lehmann & Lindenberg In Lehmann) Lehmann & Lindenberg In G., L. & N., 1845
Frullania macrophylla Hattori, 1980
Frullania macularis Taylor, 1846
Frullania madagascariensis Gottsche, 1882
Frullania madens Stephani, 1924
Frullania madothecoides Spruce, 1884
Frullania magellanica (Sprengel) Weber & Nees In G., L. & N., 1845
Frullania magellanica var. diminutiva Herzog, 1938
Frullania mammilligera Grolle, 2003
Frullania mammillosa Hattori, 1977
Frullania matafaoica Miller, 1981
Frullania mathanii Stephani, 1911
Frullania mauritiana Austin, 1869
Frullania maymyoensis Svihla, 1958
Frullania mcveanii Hattori, 1973
Frullania media (Hodgson) Hattori, 1983
Frullania megalostipa Spruce, 1884
Frullania meijeri Hattori, 1974
Frullania meridana Stephani, 1911
Frullania meyeniana Lindenberg In G., L. & N., 1845
Frullania meyeniana var. dioica Hattori, 1977
Frullania microauriculata Verdoorn, 1929
Frullania microauriculata var. rotundior Verdoorn, 1929
Frullania microcaulis Gola, 1923
Frullania microcephala Gottsche, 1863
Frullania microphylla (Gottsche In Gottsche & Rabenhorst) Pearson, 1894
Frullania microphylla F. Corticicola Schiffner, 1936
Frullania microphylla var. deciduifolia Grolle, 1970
Frullania microrhyncha Clark & Svihla, 1950
Frullania microscopica Pearson, 1922
Frullania minor Subsp. (Minor 1975) var. integribracteola Hattori, 1975
Frullania minor Subsp. Recurviloba Hattori, 1975
Frullania mirabilis Jack & Stephani In Stephani, 1892
Frullania miradorensis Lindenberg & Gottsche In G., L. & N., 1847
Frullania mizutanii Kamimura & Hattori, 1973
Frullania moniliata Subsp. Breviramea (Stephani) Verdoorn, 1930
Frullania moniliata Subsp. Moniliata Crandall-Stotler , Geissler & Stotler, 1987
Frullania moniliata Subsp. Moniliata F. Minshanensis (Hattori) Crandall-Stotler Et Alii, 1987
Frullania moniliata Subsp. Moniliata var. elongatistipula (Verdoorn) Crandall-Stotler Et Alii, 1987
Frullania moniliata Subsp. Moniliata var. vietnamica (Hattori) Crandall-Stotler Et Alii, 1987
Frullania monocera (Hooker & Taylor) Taylor In G., L. & N., 1845
Frullania monocera var. depauperata Hattori, 1984
Frullania monocera var. schiffneri (Verdoorn) Hattori, 1979
Frullania monoica Stephani, 1900
Frullania montagnei Gottsche In G., L. & N., 1845
Frullania montana Stephani, 1910
Frullania moritziana Lindenberg & Gottsche In G., L. & N, 1847
Frullania moritziana var. (Beta) Mexicana Gottsche, 1863
Frullania morobensis Hattori & Streimann, 1985
Frullania motoyana Stephani, 1911
Frullania mucronata (Lehmann & Lindenberg In Lehmann) Lehmann & Linde,nberg
Frullania mucronata var. submutica Lehmann & Lindenberg In G., L. & N. 1845 In G., L. & N., 1845
Frullania multilacera Subsp. (Multilacera 1987) Stephani, 1911
Frullania multilacera Subsp. (Multilacera 1987) var. lacerissima Hattori, 1975
Frullania multilacera Subsp. Gracilior Hattori, 1987
Frullania multilaceroides Hattori, 1987
Frullania muscicola Stephani, 1894
Frullania mutilata Stephani, 1911

N
Frullania nadeaudii Stephani, 1911
Frullania neocaledonica Engel In Engel & Merrill, 1999
Frullania neosheana Hattori, 1979
Frullania nepalensis (Sprengel) Lehmann & Lindenberg In G., L. & N., 1845
Frullania neurota Taylor, 1846
Frullania nicholsonii Hodgson, 1949
Frullania nigricaulis (R., B. & N.) Nees In G., L. & N., 1845
Frullania nigricaulis var. elongata Verdoorn, 1930
Frullania nisquallensis Sullivant, 1849
Frullania nivimontana Hattori, 1982
Frullania nobilis Stephani, 1894
Frullania nobilis var. cochleata (Stephani) Hattori In Hattori & Streimann, 1985
Frullania nodulosa (Reinwardt, Blume & Nees) Nees In G., L. & N., 1845
Frullania notarsii Stephani, 1911
Frullania novocurvirostris Hattori, 1981
Frullania novoguineensis Schiffner, 1890

O
Frullania oahuensis Hampe In G., L. & N., 1843
Frullania oakesiana Subsp. (Oakesiana 1992) Austin, 1870
Frullania oakesiana Subsp. Takayuensis (Stephani) Schuster, 1992
Frullania obovata Hattori, 1982
Frullania obscurifolia Mitten, 1879
Frullania ocanniensis Stephani, 1924
Frullania ocellata Kamimura & Hattori, 1973
Frullania odontostipa Spruce, 1890
Frullania okinawensis Kamimura, 1982
Frullania onraedtii Vanden Berghen, 1976
Frullania orbicularis Austin, 1869
Frullania orientalis Sande Lacoste, 1855
Frullania orinocensis Spruce, 1883
Frullania ornithocephala (Reinwardt, Blume & Nees) Nees In G., L. & N., 1845
Frullania ornithocephala F. Magnilobula Hattori, 1976
Frullania ornithocephala F. Retusa Hattori, 1976
Frullania ornithocephala F. Teres (Sande Lacoste) Verdoorn, 1929
Frullania ornithocephala var. maior Nees, 1845
Frullania ornithocephala var. minor Nees, 1845
Frullania ornithocephala var. pilosa Verdoorn, 1929
Frullania ornithocephala var. tuberculosa Hattori, 1974
Frullania osculatiana Notaris, 1855
Frullania osumiensis (Hattori) Hattori In Iwatsuki & Hattori, 1956
Frullania osumiensis var. dentata Kamimura, 1970

P
Frullania pachyderma Hattori, 1978
Frullania pallide-Virens Stephani, 1911
Frullania pallidula Hattori, 1988
Frullania pancheri Gottsche Ex Stephani, 1894
Frullania papillata Stephani, 1911
Frullania papillilobula Hattori, 1975
Frullania papuana Verdoorn, 1930
Frullania papulosa Stephani, 1911
Frullania paradoxa Lehmann & Lindenberg In G., L. & N., 1845
Frullania paradoxa F. Cornistipula Herzog, 1952
Frullania parhami (Schuster) Schuster, 1992
Frullania pariharii Hattori & Thaithong, 1978
Frullania pariharii F. Intermedia Hattori & Thaithong, 1978
Frullania parvifolia Stephani, 1910
Frullania parvistipula Stephani, 1910
Frullania patagonica Stephani, 1910
Frullania patula Mitten In Hooker, 1855
Frullania pauciramea Stephani, 1911
Frullania pauciramea var. pauciramella Hattori & Piippo, 1986
Frullania paucirameoides Hattori & Piippo, 1986
Frullania pearceana Stephani, 1911
Frullania pedicellata Stephani, 1897
Frullania pentapleura Subsp. (Pentapleura 1988) Taylor, 1846
Frullania peruviana Gottsche In G., L. & N., 1846
Frullania phalangiflora Stephani, 1916
Frullania philippinensis Stephani, 1911
Frullania physantha Mitten Mitten, 1861
Frullania pilibracteola Hattori, 1977
Frullania piliflora Stephani, 1911
Frullania piliflora var. appendiculata Herzog, 1951
Frullania pilistipula Stephani, 1911
Frullania piptophylla Hattori, 1980
Frullania piptophylla var. minor Hattori, 1986
Frullania piptophylloides Hattori, 1980
Frullania pittier I Stephani, 1892
Frullania plana Sullivant, 1849
Frullania planifolia Stephani, 1910
Frullania platycalyx Herzog, 1952
Frullania platyphylla Colenso, 1889
Frullania pluricarinata Gottsche, 1864
Frullania pocsantha Thaithong & Hattori, 1977
Frullania polyclada Colenso, 1889
Frullania polyptera Taylor, 1846
Frullania polyptera var. angustata (Mitten) Hattori, 1975
Frullania polysticta Lindenberg In G., L. & N., 1845
Frullania ponapensis Hattori & Koike In Koike, 1994
Frullania pringlei Fulford & Sharp, 1990
Frullania probosciphora Taylor, 1846
Frullania prominula Hattori & Streimann, 1985
Frullania propaginea Hattori & Streimann, 1985
Frullania pseudericoides Hattori, 1982
Frullania pseudericoides Hattori, 1986
Frullania pseudomeyeniana Hattori, 1986
Frullania pseudomonocera Hattori, 1986
Frullania pseudoschensiana Hattori, 1980
Frullania pseudoschensiana var. darjeelingensis Hattori, 1981
Frullania ptychantha Montagne, 1843
Frullania pulchella Herzog, 1954
Frullania pullei Verdoorn, 1930
Frullania pulogensis Stephani, 1911
Frullania punctata Reimers, 1931
Frullania purpurea Stephani, 1911
Frullania pusilla Mitten, 1871
Frullania pycnantha (Hooker & Taylor) Taylor In G., L. & N., 1845
Frullania pycnoclada Grolle In Grolle & Meister, 2004
Frullania pyricalycina Stephani, 1910

Q
Frullania queenslandica Stephani, 1910
Frullania quillotensis (Nees & Montagne) Nees & Montagne In Montagne In Alcide D'orbigny, 1839
Frullania quillotensis F. Flaccida Herzog, 1954
Frullania quillotensis F. Leiantha Herzog, 1954

R
Frullania rabenhorstii Stephani, 1911
Frullania ramuligera (Nees) Montagne, 1842
Frullania recurvistipula Hattori, 1975
Frullania reflexistipula Sande Lacoste, 1853
Frullania reflexistipula var. novocaledonica Hattori, 1977
Frullania reflexistipula var. squarrosa Hattori & Piippo, 1986
Frullania regularis Schiffner, 1890
Frullania reicheana Stephani, 1910
Frullania reimersii Verdoorn, 1930
Frullania remotidens Hattori, 1872
Frullania remotifolia Stephani, 1911
Frullania remotiloba Stephani, 1894
Frullania repanda Gottsche, 1864
Frullania repandistipula Subsp. (Repandistipula 1975) Sande Lacoste, 1853
Frullania repandistipula Subsp. Queenslandica Hattori, 1987
Frullania repandistipula Subsp. Spinibractea Hattori, 1975
Frullania reptans var. integristipula Nicholson, 1925
Frullania retusa Mitten, 1861
Frullania retusa var. gymnantha Hattori & Thaithong, 1978
Frullania retusa var. hirsuta Hattori & Thaithong, 1978
Frullania rhystocolea Herzog Ex Verdoorn In Handel-Mazzetti, 1930
Frullania rhytidantha Hattori, 1980
Frullania rigescens Spruce, 1884
Frullania rigida Stephani, 1910
Frullania ringens Spruce, 1884
Frullania riojaneirensis (Raddi) Ångström, 1876
Frullania riparia Hampe Ex Lehmann, 1838
Frullania rizalli Piippo & Hattori, 1992
Frullania rostellata Mitten In Hooker, 1867
Frullania rostrata (Hooker & Taylor) Hooker & Taylor In G., L. & N., 1845
Frullania rubella Gottsche Ex Stephani, 1889
Frullania rubella var. elongata (Stephani) Hattori, 1983
Frullania rudolfiana Hattori, 1972
Frullania rupicola Stephani, 1924

S
Frullania sabahana Hattori, 1976
Frullania sabaliana Schuster, 1983
Frullania sabanetica Gottsche, 1864
Frullania sachapatensis Stephani, 1911
Frullania sackawana Stephani, 1897
Frullania sackawana var. minor Kamimura, 1982
Frullania saipanensis Hattori & Koike In Koike, 1994
Frullania sarawakensis Hattori, 1976
Frullania scalaris Hattori, 1977
Frullania scandens Montagne, 1843
Frullania schaefer-Verwimpii Yuzawa & Hattori, 1989
Frullania schensiana Massalongo, 1897
Frullania schiffneri Verdoorn, 1929
Frullania schimperi Nees In G., L. & N., 1845
Frullania schimperi var. laciniata Vanden Berghen, 1976
Frullania schumannii (Caspary) Grolle, 1981
Frullania schusteri Hattori, 1988
Frullania schusteriana Hattori, 1972
Frullania scottiana Hattori, 1987
Frullania sebastianopolitana var. (Delta) Gottsche, 1864
Frullania selwyniana Pearson, 1890
Frullania semienana Gola, 1914
Frullania semivillosa Lindenberg & Gottsche In G., L. & N., 1847
Frullania semivillosa var. (Beta) Glabra Lindenberg & Gottsche In G., L. & N., 1847
Frullania sergiae Sim-Sim, Fontihna, Mues & Lion, 2000
Frullania seriata Gottsche Ex Stephani, 1889
Frullania seriatifolia Stephani, 1894
Frullania serrata Subsp. (Serrata 1982) Gottsche In G., L. & N., 1845
Frullania serrata Subsp. (Serrata 1982) F. Crispulodentata Verdoorn, 1929
Frullania serrata Subsp. (Serrata 1982) F. Vogelkopensis Hattori, 1982
Frullania serrata Subsp. (Serrata 1982) var. ceramensis Hattori, 1986
Frullania serrata Subsp. (Serrata 1982) var. hamatispina (Hattori) Hattori, 1982
Frullania serrata Subsp. (Serrata 1982) var. oceanica Verdoorn, 1937
Frullania serrata Subsp. (Serrata 1982) var. pertenuis (Nees) Gottsche In G., L. & N., 1845
Frullania serrata Subsp. Grolleana Grolle & Piippo, 1984
Frullania serrata Subsp. Spinistipula (Hattori) Hattori, 1982
Frullania setacea Hattori, 1988
Frullania setigera Stephani, 1894
Frullania shanensis Svihla, 1957
Frullania sharpantha Udar & Kumar, 1983
Frullania sharpii Hattori, 1974
Frullania sheana Hattori, 1979
Frullania simmondsii Stephani In Stephani & Watts, 1914
Frullania sinensis Stephani In Levier, 1906
Frullania sinosphaerantha Hattori & Lin, 1985
Frullania sinuata Subsp. Sinuata 1975 Sande Lacoste, 1853
Frullania sinuata Subsp. Sinuata F. Parvistylata Hattori In Grolle & Piippo, 1984
Frullania socotrana Mitten In Balfour, 1888
Frullania solanderiana Colenso, 1889
Frullania spathulistipa Stephani, 1910
Frullania speciosa Herzog, 1949
Frullania spegazzinii Reiner, 1988
Frullania sphaerantha Hattori, 1980
Frullania sphaerocephala Spruce, 1884
Frullania sphaerolobulata Lin In Lin & Chen, 1997
Frullania spicata (Lehmann & Lindenberg In Lehmann) Lehmann & Lindenberg In G., L. & N., 1845
Frullania spinifera Taylor, 1846
Frullania spinigastria Hattori, 1979
Frullania spiniplica Hattori, 1972
Frullania spinistipula Stephani, 1911
Frullania spongiosa Stephani, 1894
Frullania squamuligera Spruce, 1884
Frullania squarrosula (Hooker & Taylor) Taylor In G., L. & N., 1845
Frullania standaerti Stephani, 1910
Frullania steereana Hattori, 1987
Frullania stenostipa Spruce, 1884
Frullania streimannii Hattori, 1983
Frullania stylifera (Schuster) Schuster, 1992
Frullania subcaduca Hattori, 1974
Frullania subclavata Stephani, 1910
Frullania subdentata Stephani, 1911
Frullania subdentata F. Longistipula Hattori, 1978
Frullania subdilatata Massalongo In Levier, 1906
Frullania subhampeana Hodgson, 1949
Frullania subincumbens Hattori, 1987
Frullania sublignosa Stephani, 1894
Frullania submultilacera Hattori & Koike In Koike, 1994
Frullania subnigricaulis Hattori, 1973
Frullania subnigricaulis var. subtruncata Hattori, 1975
Frullania subocellata Hattori, 1986
Frullania subpedicellata Hattori, 1980
Frullania subpilibracteola Hattori, 1977
Frullania subpyricalycina Herzog, 1954
Frullania subrostrata Hattori, 1972
Frullania subsquarrosa Hattori, 1972
Frullania subtilissima Lindenberg In G., L. & N., 1845
Frullania subtropica Stephani, 1910
Frullania subtruncata Stephani, 1910
Frullania subvalida Hattori & Thaithong, 1978
Frullania supradecomposita (Lehmann & Lindenberg In Lehmann) Lehmann & Lindenberg In G., L. & N., 1845
Frullania svihlana Hattori, 1983

T
Frullania tagawana (Hattori, Thaithong & Kitawana) Hattori In Hattori & Lin, 1985
Frullania taiheizana Horikawa, 1934
Frullania tamarisci (L.) Dumortier, 1835
Frullania tamarisci var. atlantica Schiffner, 1936
Frullania tamarisci var. atrovirens Carrington, 1863
Frullania tamarisci var. commutata Nees In G., L. & N., 1845
Frullania tamarisci var. cornubica Carrington In Carrington & Pearson, 1878
Frullania tamarisci var. laxa Nees In G., L. & N., 1845
Frullania tamarisci var. mediterranea (De Notaris) Nees In G., L. & N., 1845
Frullania tamarisci var. robusta Lindberg, 1875
Frullania tamarisci var. sardoa (De Notaris) De Notaris, 1865
Frullania tamarisci var. schiffneri Nicholson, 1933
Frullania tamsuina Stephani, 1910
Frullania taradakenis Stephani, 1910
Frullania taxodiocola Schuster, 1983
Frullania teneriffae (Weber) Nees, 1838
Frullania teneriffae F. Explanata (Macvicar) Bisang, Schumacker, Sérgio & Grolle, 1988
Frullania teneriffae var. germana (Taylor) Bisang, Schumacker, Sérgio & Grolle, 1988
Frullania tenuirostris Stephani, 1911
Frullania ternatensis Gottsche In G., L. & N., 1846
Frullania ternatensis var. non-Appendiculata Hattori, 1974
Frullania tetraptera Nees & Montagne In Montagne, 1838
Frullania thiersiae Hattori, 1988
Frullania tixieri Hattori, 1976
Frullania tjibodensis Hattori & Thaithong, 1977
Frullania togashiana Hattori, 1975
Frullania tongariroense Colenso, 1889
Frullania trianae Gottsche, 1864
Frullania tricarinata Sande Lacoste, 1856
Frullania trichodes Mitten, 1862
Frullania trigona Clark, Jovet-Ast & Frye, 1947
Frullania trinervis (Lehmann & Lindenberg) Drège, 1843
Frullania triquetra Lindenberg & Gottsche In G., L. & N., 1847
Frullania trollii Herzog, 1942
Frullania truncata Caspary, 1887
Frullania tubercularis Hattori & Lin, 1985
Frullania tunguraguana Clark & Frye, 1952
Frullania turfosa Lindenberg & Gottsche In G., L. & N., 1847
Frullania tuyamae Hattori & Thaithong, 1978

U
Frullania udarii Nath & Singh, 2006
Frullania umbonata Mitten Ex Stephani, 1911
Frullania undulata Kamimura, 1961
Frullania usambarana Schiffner Ex Stephani, 1894
Frullania usambarana var. reducta Vanden Berghen, 1976
Frullania usamiensis Stephani, 1897
Frullania utriculata Stephani, 1894

V
Frullania vaga Mitten In Seemann, 1871
Frullania vaginata (Swartz) Nees In G., L. & N., 1846
Frullania valdiviensis Jack & Stephani In Stephani, 1894
Frullania valida Stephani, 1910
Frullania valparaisiana Lehmann, 1857
Frullania vandenberghenii Pocs In Bizot & Pocs, 1979
Frullania van-Zantenii Kamimura & Hattori, 1973
Frullania variabilis Stephani, 1910
Frullania varians Caspary, 1887
Frullania variegata Stephani, 1894
Frullania venusta Hattori, 1974
Frullania verdoorniana Hattori, 1973
Frullania victoriensis Stephani, 1910
Frullania vitalii Yuzawa & Hattori, 1988
Frullania vittata Hattori, 1974
Frullania vittata F. Denticulata Hattori, 1980
Frullania vittiana Hattori, 1987

W
Frullania wagneri Stephani, 1910
Frullania wairua Konrat & Braggins, 2005
Frullania wangii Hattori & Lin, 1985
Frullania warnckeana Hattori, 1974
Frullania warnckeana var. dentosa Hattori, 1977
Frullania weberbaueri Stephani, 1911
Frullania winteri Stephani, 1910
Frullania winteri var. vanderhammenii (Haarbrink) Yuzawa, 1991

Y
Frullania yorkiana Stephani, 1911
Frullania yuennanensis Stephani, 1894
Frullania yuennanensis var. siamensis (Hatt. et al.) Hattori & Lin, 1985
Frullania yusawae Kamimura, 1970
Frullania yuzawana Hattori, 1981

Z
Frullania zangii Hattori & Lin, 1985
Frullania zennoskeana Hattori, 1984

Extinct species 
 †Frullania baerlocheri Heinrichs et al., 2012 Burmese amber, Myanmar, Cenomanian
 †Frullania cretacea Hentschel et al., 2009 Burmese amber, Myanmar, Cenomanian
 †Frullania partita Li et al, 2020 Burmese amber, Myanmar, Cenomanian
 †Frullania pinnata Heinrichs et al., 2017 Burmese amber, Myanmar, Cenomanian

References 

Porellales genera
Frullaniaceae
Taxonomy articles created by Polbot